Krop khem (meaning "salty chip") is a Thai snack and it is like khrongkhraeng but softer. The shape of krop khem is like a thin square sheet; however, it can be changed depending on the maker. But khrongkhraeng has to be stretched and put in a mold to make its shape or a banana steam can be used. 

It is made of wheat flour, eggs, water, vegetable oil, sugar, black pepper, salt, coriander roots and garlic.

References

Thai desserts and snacks